Sand burr is a common name for several plants and may refer to:

Cenchrus, a grass
Xanthium, a broad-leaved plant

See also
Sand bur